This is a list of Lake Forest Foresters players in the NFL Draft.

Key

Selections

References

Lists of National Football League draftees by college football team

Lake Forest Foresters NFL Draft